Mervyn George Everett (7 October 1917 – 27 October 1988) was an Australian politician and judge.

Born in Hobart, Tasmania, Everett was educated at the University of Tasmania before becoming a barrister. In 1964, he was elected to the Tasmanian House of Assembly as the Labor member for Denison. He was Minister for Health 1964–1969, then Deputy Premier, Attorney-General and Minister for Environment, Racing and Gaming 1972–1974.

In 1974, Everett transferred to federal politics, winning a Tasmanian seat in the Australian Senate for the Australian Labor Party. He was defeated in 1975.

After his retirement from politics, Everett returned to the law. He was appointed to the Supreme Court of Tasmania by the Lowe government, serving from 7 November 1978 to 14 March 1984. He was appointed to the Federal Court of Australia by the Hawke Labor government, serving from 27 June 1984 to 4 October 1987. Everett is one of only six politicians to have served in both the Parliament of Australia and the Federal Court of Australia, alongside Nigel Bowen, Robert Ellicott, Tony Whitlam, John Reeves and Duncan Kerr.

References

1917 births
1988 deaths
Australian Labor Party members of the Parliament of Australia
Members of the Australian Senate for Tasmania
Members of the Australian Senate
Members of the Tasmanian House of Assembly
Deputy Premiers of Tasmania
Judges of the Federal Court of Australia
Judges of the Supreme Court of Tasmania
University of Tasmania alumni
Australian Labor Party members of the Parliament of Tasmania
20th-century Australian politicians